The discography of American rock band The Replacements consists of seven studio albums, four live albums, seven compilation albums, five extended plays, 16 singles, and 10 music videos. Formed in Minneapolis, Minnesota by guitarist and vocalist Paul Westerberg, guitarist Bob Stinson, bass guitarist Tommy Stinson, and drummer Chris Mars in 1979, the band signed with Twin/Tone Records the following year.

Albums

Studio albums

Live albums

Compilation albums

Extended plays

Singles

Music videos
 "Bastards of Young" (1985) (from Tim)
 "Hold My Life" (1985) (from Tim)
 "Left of the Dial" (1985) (from Tim)
 "Little Mascara" (1985) (from Tim)
 "The Ledge" (1987) (from Pleased to Meet Me)
 "Alex Chilton" (1987) (from Pleased to Meet Me)
 "I'll Be You" (1989) (from Don't Tell a Soul)
 "Achin' to Be" (1989) (from Don't Tell a Soul)
 "Merry Go Round" (1990) (from All Shook Down)
 "When It Began" (1991) (from All Shook Down)

Notes

References

Discographies of American artists
Rock music group discographies